Giovanni Rossi Lomanitz (10 October 1921 – 31 December 2002) was an American physicist.

Biography 
He was born in Bryan, Texas and grew up in Oklahoma. His father was an agricultural chemist and named his son after the Italian socialist Giovanni Rossi, who had founded an agricultural commune in Brazil in the 1890s. Lomanitz graduated from high school at age 14 and went on to earn his bachelor of science degree in physics from the University of Oklahoma and his doctorate in theoretical physics in 1951 from Cornell University under Richard Feynman.

In the early 1940s Lomanitz started graduate school at the University of California, Berkeley. While there, he became a protégé of the physicist J. Robert Oppenheimer. Lomanitz worked at the Berkeley Radiation Laboratory on a new method of electromagnetic separation of isotopes. Lomanitz's graduate research was cut short when the Counterintelligence Corp ensured he was drafted into the Army during World War II.

During the period 1942-45 Oppenheimer was responsible for the employment on the atomic bomb project of Lomanitz. Oppenheimer urged him to work on the Manhattan Project, although Oppenheimer later told government security personnel that he knew Lomanitz had been very much of a "red" when he first came to the University of California. Oppenheimer said he told Lomanitz that he must forgo all political activity if he came onto the project. In August 1943, Oppenheimer protested against the termination of Lomanitz's military deferment and requested that he be returned to the project after his entry into the military service.

While at the Radiation Laboratory, Lomanitz helped to establish a local chapter of the Federation of Architects, Engineers, Chemists, and Technicians (FAECT), a small white-collar CIO union.

The Federal Bureau of Investigation had placed a listening device in the residence of Communist Party activist Steve Nelson, and in October 1942 overheard a man referred to as "Joe", whom the FBI suspected of being Lomanitz's close friend Joseph Weinberg, describing to Nelson the significance and technical outlines of the secret nuclear research done at Berkeley. Future spying for the Soviet Union was implied. This led the United States Government to push Weinberg, Lomanitz, and David Bohm out of the program. For Lomanitz, this process of removal involved the termination of his draft deferment. He was drafted and served in the Pacific. After the war he returned for a time to Berkeley and then moved to Cornell, where he completed his PhD under Richard Feynman.

After the war Lomanitz was called to testify before the House Un-American Activities Committee. He adamantly asserted his loyalty to the United States and invoked the Fifth Amendment, and declined to name others involved with Communist activities.

The Atomic Energy Commission Personnel Security Board (PSB) found in 1954 that Oppenheimer had stated in 1943 that he did not want anybody working on the project who was a member of the Communist Party, since "one always had a question of divided loyalty" and the discipline of the Communist Party was very severe and not compatible with complete loyalty to the project. Oppenheimer, however, did not identify former members of the Communist Party who were working on the project to appropriate authorities.

Lomanitz then worked at several jobs, including as a railroad maintenance worker.

In 1962 he began working at the New Mexico Institute of Mining and Technology and later became department chairman, before retiring in 1991. He later moved to Pahoa, Hawaii and died of cancer there at the end of 2002.

References

 Findings and Recommendations of the Personnel Security Board in the Matter of Dr. J. Robert Oppenheimer
“Report on Atomic Espionage (Nelson-Weinberg and Hiskey-Adams Cases),” 29 September 1949, U.S. Congress, House of Representatives, Committee on Un-American Activities, 89th Cong., 1st sess., 1–15.
 San Francisco FBI report of 1 July 1945 through 15 March 1947, Comintern Apparatus file, serial 5421.
 Oral transcription of interview between Lt. Col. John Landsdale, Jr., and Dr. J. Robert Oppenheimer, 12 September 1943

Manhattan Project people
20th-century American physicists
University of Oklahoma alumni
Cornell University alumni
University of California, Berkeley alumni
Scientists from Oklahoma
1921 births
2003 deaths
New Mexico Institute of Mining and Technology faculty